The Huaku Sky Garden is a residential skyscraper located in Shilin District, Taipei, Taiwan. It is the tallest building in Shilin District, the 46th tallest building in Taiwan and one of the tallest residential buildings in Taipei.

Design 
Designed by the Singaporean WOHA architectural team, under the requirements of preventing earthquakes and typhoons common in Taiwan, the symmetrical structural frame was adopted to promote a multi-scale Chinese-style folding screen, presented with a super-large structural frame and metal filigree.
Each household in the building has an open balcony with a ceiling height of more than seven meters. There is also an indoor heated swimming pool located on the 2nd floor.

See also 
 List of tallest buildings in Taiwan
 List of tallest buildings in Taipei

References

2017 establishments in Taiwan
Residential skyscrapers in Taiwan
Skyscrapers in Taipei
Apartment buildings in Taiwan
Residential buildings completed in 2017